The 2019–20 Mizoram Premier League is the eighth season of the Mizoram Premier League, the top division football league in the Indian state of Mizoram. The league will kick off from 5 September 2019 with eight teams competing.

Aizawl FC won its 4th title on 14 December 2019 after defeating Electric Veng FC.

Teams
 Aizawl
 Chanmari
 Chawnpui FC
 Chhinga Veng
 Electric Veng FC
 Mizoram Police 
 Ramhlun North FC
 FC Venghnuai

Standings

Matches

Round 1

Round 2

Round 3

Round 4

Round 5

Round 6

Round 7

Round 8

Round 9

Round 10

Round 11

Round 12

Round 13

Round 14

Finals

Semi-finals

1st Leg

2nd Leg

Final

Statistics

Scorers
11 goals
  MC Malsawmzuala (Chhinga Veng)

10 goals
  Lalremsanga (Aizawl)

8 goals
  Alfred Jaryan (Aizawl)

Clean sheets

References

External links
 Mizoram Premier League on facebook
 MPL on IndiaFooty.com

Mizoram Premier League
2019–20 in Indian football leagues
Football in Mizoram